Yunlong may refer to:

 Yunlong County, Dali Prefecture, Yunnan
 Yunlong District, Xuzhou, Jiangsu
 Luzhou Yunlong Airport, in Yunlong Town, Lu County, Luzhou, Sichuan

Towns
 Yunlong, Chongqing (zh), subdivision of Liangping District, Chongqing
 Yunlong, Hainan (zh), subdivision of Qiongshan District, Haikou, Hainan
 Yunlong, Jianyang, Sichuan (zh), subdivision of Jianyang, Sichuan
 Yunlong, Lu County (zh), subdivision of Lu County, Sichuan
 Yunlong, Zhejiang (zh), subdivision of Yinzhou District, Ningbo, Zhejiang

Townships
 Yunlong Township, Fujian (zh), subdivision of Minqing County, Fujian
 Yunlong Township, Yunnan (zh), subdivision of Luquan County, Yunnan